Kujō Station (九条駅, Kujō-eki) is the name of several train stations in the Kansai region, Japan:
 Kujō Station (Nara), on the Kintetsu Kashihara Line in Yamatokōriyama, Nara
 Kujō Station (Kyoto), on the Kyoto Municipal Subway Karasuma Line in Kyoto 
 Kujō Station (Osaka), on the Osaka Metro Chuo Line and the Hanshin Namba Line in Osaka

EMUs owned by Kintetsu arrive at and depart from those 4 stations, and the stations are on the route map of Kintetsu Nara-Kyoto Line area.

References